Beyond the Pecos is a 1945 American Western film directed by Lambert Hillyer and written by Bennett Cohen. The film stars Rod Cameron, Eddie Dew, Fuzzy Knight, Jennifer Holt, Ray Whitley, Gene Roth, Robert Homans and Jack Ingram. The film was released on April 27, 1945, by Universal Pictures.

Plot

Cast        
Rod Cameron as Lew Remington
Eddie Dew as Bob Randall
Fuzzy Knight as Barnacle Pete Finnegan
Jennifer Holt as Ellen Tanner
Ray Whitley as Dan Muncie
Gene Roth as John Heydrick 
Robert Homans as Ed Remington
Jack Ingram as Steve Grenfels 
Frank Jaquet as Ord Tanner
Henry Wills as Arizona 
Jack Rockwell as Keno Hawkins

References

External links
 

1945 films
American Western (genre) films
1945 Western (genre) films
Universal Pictures films
Films directed by Lambert Hillyer
American black-and-white films
1940s English-language films
1940s American films